Cranberries are a group of evergreen dwarf shrubs or trailing vines in the subgenus Oxycoccus of the genus Vaccinium. In Britain, cranberry may refer to the native species Vaccinium oxycoccos, while in North America, cranberry may refer to Vaccinium macrocarpon. Vaccinium oxycoccos is cultivated in central and northern Europe, while Vaccinium macrocarpon is cultivated throughout the northern United States, Canada and Chile. In some methods of classification, Oxycoccus is regarded as a genus in its own right. They can be found in acidic bogs throughout the cooler regions of the Northern Hemisphere.

The flowers are dark pink, with very distinct reflexed petals, leaving the style and stamens fully exposed and pointing forward. They are pollinated by bees. The fruit is a berry that is larger than the leaves of the plant; it is initially light green, turning red when ripe. It is edible, but with an acidic taste that usually overwhelms its sweetness.

In 2020, the United States, Canada, and Chile accounted for 97% of the world production of cranberries. Most cranberries are processed into products such as juice, sauce, jam, and sweetened dried cranberries, with the remainder sold fresh to consumers. Cranberry sauce is a traditional accompaniment to turkey at Christmas and Thanksgiving dinners in the United States and Canada, and at Christmas dinner in the United Kingdom.

Species and description 
Cranberries are related to bilberries, blueberries, and huckleberries, all in Vaccinium subgenus Vaccinium. These differ in having bell-shaped flowers, the petals not being reflexed, and woodier stems, forming taller shrubs. There are 3-4 species of cranberry, classified by subgenus:

Subgenus Oxycoccus
Vaccinium oxycoccos or Oxycoccus palustris (common cranberry, northern cranberry or cranberry) is widespread throughout the cool temperate Northern Hemisphere, including northern Europe, northern Asia, and northern North America. It has small  leaves, with an inrolled margin. The flowers are dark pink, with a purple central spike, produced on finely hairy stalks. The fruit is a small pale pink to red berry, with a refreshing sharp acidic flavor.
Vaccinium microcarpum or Oxycoccus microcarpus (small cranberry) occurs in northern North America, northern Europe and northern Asia. It is highly similar to V. oxycoccos, differing in the leaves being more triangular, and the flower stems hairless; additionally, their stems can also be smaller and produce a smaller number of flowers than V. ocycoccos. They also differ in the fact that their leaves can be smaller in size, even though the main difference is their triangular shape. Some botanists include it within V. oxycoccos.
Vaccinium macrocarpon or Oxycoccus macrocarpus (large cranberry, American cranberry, bearberry) native to northern North America across Canada, and eastern United States, south to North Carolina at high altitudes).

Subgenus Oxycoccus, sect. Oxycoccoides
Vaccinium erythrocarpum or Oxycoccus erythrocarpus (southern mountain cranberry) native to southeastern North America at high altitudes in the southern Appalachian Mountains, and also in eastern Asia.

Etymology 

The name cranberry derives from the German kraanbere (English translation, craneberry), first named as cranberry in English by the missionary John Eliot in 1647. Around 1694, German and Dutch colonists in New England used the word, cranberry, to represent the expanding flower, stem, calyx, and petals resembling the neck, head, and bill of a crane. The traditional English name for the plant more common in Europe, Vaccinium oxycoccos, fenberry, originated from plants with small red berries found growing in fen (marsh) lands of England.

History 

In North America, the Narragansett people of the Algonquian nation in the regions of New England appeared to be using cranberries in pemmican for food and for dye. Calling the red berries, sasemineash, the Narragansett people may have introduced cranberries to colonists in Massachusetts. In 1550, James White Norwood made reference to Native Americans using cranberries, and it was the first reference to American cranberries up until this point. In James Rosier's book The Land of Virginia there is an account of Europeans coming ashore and being met with Native Americans bearing bark cups full of cranberries. In Plymouth, Massachusetts, there is a 1633 account of the husband of Mary Ring auctioning her cranberry-dyed petticoat for 16 shillings. In 1643, Roger Williams's book A Key Into the Language of America described cranberries, referring to them as "bearberries" because bears ate them. In 1648, preacher John Elliott was quoted in Thomas Shepard's book Clear Sunshine of the Gospel with an account of the difficulties the Pilgrims were having in using the Indians to harvest cranberries as they preferred to hunt and fish. In 1663, the Pilgrim cookbook appears with a recipe for cranberry sauce. In 1667, New Englanders sent to King Charles ten barrels of cranberries, three barrels of codfish and some Indian corn as a means of appeasement for his anger over their local coining of the pine tree shilling  minted by John Hull. In 1669, Captain Richard Cobb had a banquet in his house (to celebrate both his marriage to Mary Gorham and his election to the Convention of Assistance), serving wild turkey with sauce made from wild cranberries. In the 1672 book New England Rarities Discovered author John Josselyn described cranberries, writing:

Sauce for the Pilgrims, cranberry or bearberry, is a small trayling [sic] plant that grows in salt marshes that are overgrown with moss. The berries are of a pale yellow color, afterwards red, as big as a cherry, some perfectly round, others oval, all of them hollow with sower [sic] astringent taste; they are ripe in August and September. They are excellent against the Scurvy. They are also good to allay the fervor of hoof diseases. The Indians and English use them mush, boyling [sic] them with sugar for sauce to eat with their meat; and it is a delicate sauce, especially with roasted mutton. Some make tarts with them as with gooseberries.

The Compleat Cook's Guide, published in 1683, made reference to cranberry juice. In 1703, cranberries were served at the Harvard University commencement dinner. In 1787, James Madison wrote Thomas Jefferson in France for background information on constitutional government to use at the Constitutional Convention. Jefferson sent back a number of books on the subject and in return asked for a gift of apples, pecans and cranberries. William Aiton, a Scottish botanist, included an entry for the cranberry in volume II of his 1789 work Hortus Kewensis. He notes that Vaccinium macrocarpon (American cranberry) was cultivated by James Gordon in 1760. In 1796, cranberries were served at the first celebration of the landing of the Pilgrims, and Amelia Simmons (an American orphan) wrote a book entitled American Cookery which contained a recipe for cranberry tarts.

American Revolutionary War veteran Henry Hall first cultivated cranberries in the Cape Cod town of Dennis around 1816. In the 1820s, Hall was shipping cranberries to New York City and Boston from which shipments were also sent to Europe. In 1843, Eli Howes planted his own crop of cranberries on Cape Cod, using the "Howes" variety. In 1847, Cyrus Cahoon planted a crop of "Early Black" variety near Pleasant Lake, Harwich, Massachusetts.

By 1900,  were under cultivation in the New England region. In 2021, the total output of cranberries harvested in the United States was 790 million lbs (359 million kg), with Wisconsin as the largest state producer (59% of total), followed by Massachusetts and Oregon.

Cultivation

Geography and bog method 

Historically, cranberry beds were constructed in wetlands. Today's cranberry beds are constructed in upland areas with a shallow water table. The topsoil is scraped off to form dykes around the bed perimeter. Clean sand is hauled in and spread to a depth of four to eight inches (10 to 20 centimeters). The surface is laser leveled flat to provide even drainage. Beds are frequently drained with socked tile in addition to the perimeter ditch. In addition to making it possible to hold water, the dykes allow equipment to service the beds without driving on the vines. Irrigation equipment is installed in the bed to provide irrigation for vine growth and for spring and autumn frost protection.

A common misconception about cranberry production is that the beds remain flooded throughout the year. During the growing season cranberry beds are not flooded, but are irrigated regularly to maintain soil moisture. Beds are flooded in the autumn to facilitate harvest and again during the winter to protect against low temperatures. In cold climates like Wisconsin, New England, and eastern Canada, the winter flood typically freezes into ice, while in warmer climates the water remains liquid. When ice forms on the beds, trucks can be driven onto the ice to spread a thin layer of sand to control pests and rejuvenate the vines. Sanding is done every three to five years.

Propagation 
Cranberry vines are propagated by moving vines from an established bed. The vines are spread on the surface of the sand of the new bed and pushed into the sand with a blunt disk. The vines are watered frequently during the first few weeks until roots form and new shoots grow. Beds are given frequent, light application of nitrogen fertilizer during the first year.

Ripening and harvest 

Cranberries are harvested in the fall when the fruit takes on its distinctive deep red color, and most ideally after the first frost. Berries that receive sun turn a deep red when fully ripe, while those that do not fully mature are a pale pink or white color. This is usually in September through the first part of November. To harvest cranberries, the beds are flooded with six to eight inches (15 to 20 centimeters) of water above the vines. A harvester is driven through the beds to remove the fruit from the vines. For the past 50 years, water reel type harvesters have been used. Harvested cranberries float in the water and can be corralled into a corner of the bed and conveyed or pumped from the bed. From the farm, cranberries are taken to receiving stations where they are cleaned, sorted, and stored prior to packaging or processing. While cranberries are harvested when they take on their deep red color, they can also be harvested beforehand when they are still white, which is how white cranberry juice is made. Yields are lower on beds harvested early and the early flooding tends to damage vines, but not severely. Vines can also be trained through dry picking to help avoid damage in subsequent harvests.

Although most cranberries are wet-picked as described above, 5–10% of the US crop is still dry-picked. This entails higher labor costs and lower yield, but dry-picked berries are less bruised and can be sold as fresh fruit instead of having to be immediately frozen or processed. Originally performed with two-handed comb scoops, dry picking is today accomplished by motorized, walk-behind harvesters which must be small enough to traverse beds without damaging the vines.

Cranberries for fresh market are stored in shallow bins or boxes with perforated or slatted bottoms, which deter decay by allowing air to circulate. Because harvest occurs in late autumn, cranberries for fresh market are frequently stored in thick walled barns without mechanical refrigeration. Temperatures are regulated by opening and closing vents in the barn as needed. Cranberries destined for processing are usually frozen in bulk containers shortly after arriving at a receiving station.

Diseases 

Diseases of cranberry include:
Cranberry fruit rot
Cranberry root rot

Production

In 2020, world production of cranberry was 663,345 tonnes, mainly by the United States, Canada, and Chile, which collectively accounted for 97% of the global total (table). Wisconsin (59% of US production) and Quebec (60% of Canadian production) were the two largest regional producers of cranberries in North America. Cranberries are also a major commercial crop in Massachusetts, New Jersey, Oregon, and Washington, as well as in the Canadian province of British Columbia (33% of Canadian production).

Food uses

Products

As fresh cranberries are hard, sour, and bitter, about 95% of cranberries are processed and used to make cranberry juice and sauce. They are also sold dried and sweetened. Cranberry juice is usually sweetened or blended with other fruit juices to reduce its natural tartness. At one teaspoon of sugar per ounce, cranberry juice cocktail is more highly sweetened than even soda drinks that have been linked to obesity.

Usually cranberries as fruit are cooked into a compote or jelly, known as cranberry sauce. Such preparations are traditionally served with roast turkey, as a staple of Thanksgiving (both in Canada and in the United States) as well as English dinners. The berry is also used in baking (muffins, scones, cakes and breads). In baking it is often combined with orange or orange zest. Less commonly, cranberries are used to add tartness to savory dishes such as soups and stews.

Fresh cranberries can be frozen at home, and will keep up to nine months; they can be used directly in recipes without thawing.

There are several alcoholic cocktails, including the Cosmopolitan, that include cranberry juice.

Nutrition 

Raw cranberries are 87% water, 12% carbohydrates, and contain negligible protein and fat (table). In a 100 gram reference amount, raw cranberries supply 46 calories and moderate levels of vitamin C, dietary fiber, and the essential dietary mineral manganese, each with more than 10% of its Daily Value. Other micronutrients have low content (table).

Dried cranberries are commonly processed with up to 10 times their natural sugar content. The drying process also eliminates vitamin C content.

Research

Urinary tract infections  

A comprehensive review in 2012 of available research concluded there is no evidence that cranberry juice or cranberry extract as tablets or capsules are effective in preventing urinary tract infections (UTIs). The European Food Safety Authority reviewed the evidence for one brand of cranberry extract and concluded a cause and effect relationship had not been established between cranberry consumption and reduced risk of UTIs.

One 2017 systematic review showed that consuming cranberry products reduced the incidence of UTIs in women with recurrent infections. Another review of small clinical studies indicated that consuming cranberry products could reduce the risk of UTIs by 26% in otherwise healthy women, although the authors indicated that larger studies were needed to confirm such an effect.

A 2021 systematic review found that there was insufficient evidence for or against using cranberry products to treat an acute UTI.

When the quality of meta-analyses on the efficacy of consuming cranberry products for preventing or treating UTIs is examined, large variation and uncertainty of effect are seen, resulting from inconsistencies of clinical research design and inadequate numbers of subjects.

Phytochemicals
Raw cranberries, cranberry juice and cranberry extracts are a source of polyphenols – including proanthocyanidins, flavonols and quercetin. These phytochemical compounds are being studied in vivo and in vitro for possible effects on the cardiovascular system, immune system and cancer. However, there is no confirmation from human studies that consuming cranberry polyphenols provides anti-cancer, immune, or cardiovascular benefits. Potential is limited by poor absorption and rapid excretion.

Cranberry juice contains a high molecular weight non-dializable material that is under research for its potential to affect formation of plaque by Streptococcus mutans pathogens that cause tooth decay. Cranberry juice components are also being studied for possible effects on kidney stone formation.

Extract quality 
Problems may arise with the lack of validation for quantifying of A-type proanthocyanidins (PAC) extracted from cranberries. For instance, PAC extract quality and content can be performed using different methods including the European Pharmacopoeia method, liquid chromatography–mass spectrometry, or a modified 4-dimethylaminocinnamaldehyde colorimetric method. Variations in extract analysis can lead to difficulties in assessing the quality of PAC extracts from different cranberry starting material, such as by regional origin, ripeness at time of harvest and post-harvest processing. Assessments show that quality varies greatly from one commercial PAC extract product to another.

Possible safety concerns 
The anticoagulant effects of warfarin may be increased by consuming cranberry juice, resulting in adverse effects such as increased incidence of bleeding and bruising. Other safety concerns from consuming large quantities of cranberry juice or using cranberry supplements include potential for nausea, and  increasing stomach inflammation, sugar intake or kidney stone formation.

Marketing and economics

United States
Cranberry sales in the United States have traditionally been associated with holidays of Thanksgiving and Christmas.

In the U.S., large-scale cranberry cultivation has been developed as opposed to other countries. American cranberry growers have a long history of cooperative marketing. As early as 1904, John Gaynor, a Wisconsin grower, and A.U. Chaney, a fruit broker from Des Moines, Iowa, organized Wisconsin growers into a cooperative called the Wisconsin Cranberry Sales Company to receive a uniform price from buyers. Growers in New Jersey and Massachusetts were also organized into cooperatives, creating the National Fruit Exchange that marketed fruit under the Eatmor brand. The success of cooperative marketing almost led to its failure. With consistent and high prices, area and production doubled between 1903 and 1917 and prices fell.

With surplus cranberries and changing American households some enterprising growers began canning cranberries that were below-grade for fresh market. Competition between canners was fierce because profits were thin. The Ocean Spray cooperative was established in 1930 through a merger of three primary processing companies: Ocean Spray Preserving company, Makepeace Preserving Co, and Cranberry Products Co. The new company was called Cranberry Canners, Inc. and used the Ocean Spray label on their products. Since the new company represented over 90% of the market, it would have been illegal under American antitrust laws had attorney John Quarles not found an exemption for agricultural cooperatives. , about 65% of the North American industry belongs to the Ocean Spray cooperative.

In 1958, Morris April Brothers—who produced Eatmor brand cranberry sauce in Tuckahoe, New Jersey—brought an action against Ocean Spray for violation of the Sherman Antitrust Act and won $200,000 in real damages plus triple damages, just in time for the Great Cranberry Scare: on 9 November 1959, Secretary of the United States Department of Health, Education, and Welfare Arthur S. Flemming announced that some of the 1959 cranberry crop was tainted with traces of the herbicide aminotriazole. The market for cranberries collapsed and growers lost millions of dollars. However, the scare taught the industry that they could not be completely dependent on the holiday market for their products; they had to find year-round markets for their fruit. They also had to be exceedingly careful about their use of pesticides. After the aminotriazole scare, Ocean Spray reorganized and spent substantial sums on product development. New products such as cranberry-apple juice blends were introduced, followed by other juice blends.

Cranberry handlers (processors) include Ocean Spray, Cliffstar Corporation, Northland Cranberries Inc. (Sun Northland LLC), Clement Pappas & Co., and Decas Cranberry Products as well as a number of small handlers and processors.

Cranberry Marketing Committee
The Cranberry Marketing Committee is an organization that was established in 1962 as a Federal Marketing Order to ensure a stable, orderly supply of good quality product. The order has been renewed and modified slightly over the years. The market order has been invoked during six crop years: 1962 (12%), 1963 (5%), 1970 (10%), 1971 (12%), 2000 (15%), and 2001 (35%). Even though supply still exceeds demand, there is little will to invoke the Federal Marketing Order out of the realization that any pullback in supply by U.S. growers would easily be filled by Canadian production.

The Cranberry Marketing Committee, based in Wareham, Massachusetts, represents more than 1,100 cranberry growers and 60 cranberry handlers across Massachusetts, Rhode Island, Connecticut, New Jersey, Wisconsin, Michigan, Minnesota, Oregon, Washington and New York (Long Island). The authority for the actions taken by the Cranberry Marketing Committee is provided in Chapter IX, Title 7, Code of Federal Regulations which is called the Federal Cranberry Marketing Order. The Order is part of the Agricultural Marketing Agreement Act of 1937, identifying cranberries as a commodity good that can be regulated by Congress.  The Federal Cranberry Marketing Order has been altered over the years to expand the Cranberry Marketing Committee's ability to develop projects in the United States and around the world. The Cranberry Marketing Committee currently runs promotional programs in the United States, China, India, Mexico, Pan-Europe, and South Korea.

International trade
, the European Union was the largest importer of American cranberries, followed individually by Canada, China, Mexico, and South Korea. From 2013 to 2017, U.S. cranberry exports to China grew exponentially, making China the second largest country importer, reaching $36 million in cranberry products. The China–United States trade war resulted in many Chinese businesses cutting off ties with their U.S. cranberry suppliers.

References 
Notes

Further reading

 Cole, S. & Gifford, L. (2009). The Cranberry: Hard Work and Holiday Sauce. Tilbury House Publishers.  
 Trehane, J. (2009). Blueberries, Cranberries and Other Vacciniums. Timber Press.

External links 

 Germplasm Resources Information Network: Sect. Oxycoccus and Sect. Oxycoccoides
 University of Massachusetts Amherst Cranberry Station for information on cranberry research
 Cranberry Library Page Hosted by the University of Wisconsin-Madison
 Wikimapia An overhead view of a cranberry farm near Wisconsin Rapids, Wisconsin
 Cranberry research at Rutgers, The State University of New Jersey
 University of Massachusetts Cranberry Station Hosted by the University of Massachusetts - Amherst
 "Harvest-Time in a Cranberry Bog", The Booklovers Magazine, December 1904. Internet Archive.

Berries
Crops originating from the United States
Vaccinium
Crops originating from Canada
Subshrubs
Medicinal plants of North America
Crops originating from indigenous Americans